Villares refers to:

People
 Aline Villares Reis (b. 1989), Brazilian footballer
 Diosdado Simón Villares (1954-2002), Spanish biologist
 Luis Villares (b. 1978), Spanish jurist

Places
 Los Villares, city located in the province of Jaén, Spain
 , near Caudete de las Fuentes, Requena-Utiel, Valencian Community, Spain
 Villares de Jadraque municipality located in the province of Guadalajara, Castile-La Mancha, Spain
 Villares de Órbigo, municipality located in the province of León, Castile and León, Spain
 Villares del Saz municipality located in the province of Cuenca, Castile-La Mancha, Spain
 Los Villares de Soria municipality located in the province of Soria, Castile and León, Spain
 Villares de la Reina municipality in the province of Salamanca, Spain
 Villares de Yeltes municipality located in the province of Salamanca, Castile and León, Spain